Jeffrey Gregory King (born May 1959) is an English financier and association football manager.

Life and career
King, a former Canvey Island player, took over ownership at Canvey in 1992 and both managed and funded the club's progress through the divisions between 1992 and 2006, where he left them in the Football Conference.

In 2006, King announced that he was terminating his association with Canvey and instead took over at Isthmian League Premier Division club Chelmsford City. During his time at Chelmsford, King managed them to the 2007–08 Isthmian League Premier Division title. He then reached the Conference South play-off semi-final in the following season.

In May 2009, King took on a new role at Chelmsford City as director of football, with his assistant Glenn Pennyfather taking control of first team affairs. He was also given a role on club's board of directors, with Pennyfather reporting directly to King.

References

1959 births
Living people
English businesspeople
English football chairmen and investors
Canvey Island F.C. players
Canvey Island F.C. managers
Chelmsford City F.C. managers
Association footballers not categorized by position
English footballers
Chelmsford City F.C. non-playing staff
Isthmian League managers